Speak No Evil is a 2009 blues album by Tinsley Ellis. It was recorded and mixed by Jim Z and Tony Terrebonne with Matt Pool assisting at Stonehenge at Zac Recording in Atlanta, Georgia. It was mastered by Rodney Mills at Rodney Mills Master House, Duluth, Georgia, and produced by Tinsley Ellis with Bruce Iglauer as executive producer. Tinsley wrote all of the songs on the album.

Track listing

Musicians
Tinsley Ellis on guitar and vocals
The Evil One on bass guitar  
Jeff Burch on drums 
Kevin McKendree on keyboards  
Pete Orenstein on keyboards

References

External links
Tinsley Ellis website

2009 albums
Tinsley Ellis albums